Bicycle trials may refer to:
 Individual time trials
 Mountain bike trials
 Track time trials